Pandag, officially the Municipality of Pandag (Maguindanaon: Ingud nu Pandag; Iranun: Inged a Pandag), is a  municipality in the province of Maguindanao del Sur, Philippines. According to the 2020 census, it has a population of 26,356 people.

It was created out of 8 barangays of Buluan, Maguindanao, by virtue of Muslim Mindanao Autonomy Act No. 203, which was subsequently ratified in a plebiscite held on December 30, 2006.

Geography

Barangays
Pandag is politically subdivided into 8 barangays.

Kabuling
Kayaga
Kayupo (Cuyapo)
Lepak
Lower Dilag
Malangit
Pandag

Climate

Demographics

Economy

Notes

References

External links
 Pandag Profile at the DTI Cities and Municipalities Competitive Index
 MMA Act No. 203 : An Act Creating Municipality of Pandag in the Province of Maguindanao
 Newly created provinces, municipalities, barangays, converted city Accessed on March 9, 2006.
 [ Philippine Standard Geographic Code]
 Philippine Census Information
 Local Governance Performance Management System

Municipalities of Maguindanao del Sur